The international community is an imprecise phrase used in geopolitics and international relations to refer to a broad group of people and governments of the world.

As a rhetorical term 
Aside from its use as a general descriptor, the term is typically used to imply the existence of a common point of view towards such matters as specific issues of human rights. It is sometimes used in calling for action to be taken against an enemy, e.g., action against perceived political repression in a target country. The term is also commonly used to imply legitimacy and consensus for a point of view on a disputed issue, e.g., to enhance the credibility of a majority vote in the United Nations General Assembly.

Criticism
Several prominent legal figures and authors have argued that the term is more often used to describe a small minority of states, and not literally all nations or states in the world. According to International Criminal Court jurist Victor P. Tsilonis, it refers to "the interests of the most powerful states" or "seven to ten states". President of the International Tribunal for the Law of the Sea Paik Jin-hyun and co-authors Lee Seokwoo and Kevin Tan argue that it could refer to "some 20 affluent states", giving the example of those not members of the Non-Aligned Movement, while Professor Peter Burnell of the University of Warwick suggests that a number of very important states, such as China, Russia and those of the Arab and Islamic worlds, are often distant from the concept of the "international community" and do not necessarily endorse every initiative associated with it, for example, by abstaining from key votes in the United Nations Security Council.

Noam Chomsky alleges that the term is used to refer to the United States and its allies and client states, as well as allies in the media of those states.

British scholar and academic Martin Jacques says: "We all know what is meant by the term 'international community', don't we? It's the West, of course, nothing more, nothing less. Using the term 'international community' is a way of dignifying the west, of globalising it, of making it sound more respectable, more neutral, and high-faluting."

According to American political scientist Samuel P. Huntington, the term is a euphemistic replacement for the earlier propaganda term "Free World".

See also 

 Democracy
 First World
 Free world
 Global village
 Internationalism (politics)
 Member states of the United Nations
 NATO
 Sources of international law
 United Nations
 World community

References 

Community
Community
Political catchphrases
Types of communities
World
Statism
Global politics
Multilateral relations
Internationalism
Globalization